Shimmering Lights is the fourth studio album by Canadian indie-rock band The Meligrove Band, released September 21, 2010 on vinyl and CD. Nevado Records released the album in Canada, while Last Gang Records released it simultaneously in the United States.

Track listing

Side A 
Ghosts At My Back - 3:30
Really Want It - 3:14
Make Believe It - 3:31
White Like Lies - 3:35
Halflight - 3:38

Side B 
Kingfisher - 2:30
Racingtoshimmeringlights - 2:52
Bones Attack!! - 2:58
This Work - 3:37
Eagles - 2:29

Personnel

Band 
 Jason Nunes - singing, guitar, piano, organ
 Darcy Rego - singing, drums, guitar, shakers
 Michael Small - bass guitar, singing

Guests 
 Rich Aucoin - vibraphone on "Bones Attack!!"
 Lily Frost - singing on "This Work"
 Brendan Howlett - trumpet on "Ghosts At My Back"
 Randy Lee - violin on "Make Believe It" and "White Like Lies" and "Racingtoshimmeringlights" and "Bones Attack!!"
 Yoroku Saki - drum samples on "Kingfisher" and "Racingtoshimmeringlights"
 Andrew Scott - trumpet on "Ghosts At My Back" and guitar on "Eagles"
 Drew Smith - singing on the last four songs
 Davina Thomson - singing on the last four songs

Release Date 
 September 21, 2010 - Canada and The United States

References 

The Meligrove Band albums
2010 albums